Yovon District (Nohiyai Yovon) is a district in Khatlon Region, Tajikistan. Its capital is the town Yovon. The population of the district is 234,600 (January 2020 estimate).

Administrative divisions
They are as follows:

References

Districts of Khatlon Region
Districts of Tajikistan